Chris Pearson (born November 12, 1990) is a former American amateur boxer and currently a professional boxer in the Middleweight division. He signed a professional managerial contract with Al Haymon to launch his pro career, whose stable of fighters includes Floyd Mayweather Jr., Jermain Taylor and Paul Williams.

Amateur career

A southpaw with a 93-8 amateur record, Pearson was the 2009 Police Athletic League national champion and now has beaten four former Olympians, including Brazil’s Yamaguichi Florentino, a veteran of over 150 fights, and Bakhyt Sarsekbayev of Kazakhstan, the 2008 Beijing Games welterweight gold medalist — both of whom he conquered in Los Angeles. Pearson spent two and a half months in Los Angeles fighting for the L.A. Matadors, a team of select amateurs who competed in the newly formed World Series of Boxing.

He was also the:

 U.S. National Amateur Middleweight Champion, sweeping his bracket.
 2-time Silver Gloves Champ
 4-time Jr Golden Gloves Champ
 8-time State Fair Champ
 Jr Olympic Bronze Medalist
 Ringside World Champion
 National PAL Champion

Professional career
Pearson secured himself the perfect professional debut at U.S. Bank Arena in Cincinnati on November 26, 2011. It was on the undercard of Adrien Broner versus Vicente Martin Rodriguez for the recently vacated WBO super featherweight crown. He knocked out opponent Steven Chadwick within the opening two minutes of the first round.

On February 25, 2012, he made quick work of Jeremy Wood (1-5, 1 KO) stopping his fellow Ohioan in one round, on the non-televised undercard of the HBO Boxing After Dark show headlined by Devon Alexander-Marcos Maidana.

As of May 2019, his professional record is 19-2.

Professional boxing record

| style="text-align:center;" colspan="8"|17 Wins (12 knockout, 5 decision), 3 Losses, 0 Draws, 1 No Contests
|-
|align=center style="border-style: none none solid solid; background: #e3e3e3"|Result
|align=center style="border-style: none none solid solid; background: #e3e3e3"|Record
|align=center style="border-style: none none solid solid; background: #e3e3e3"|Opponent
|align=center style="border-style: none none solid solid; background: #e3e3e3"|Type
|align=center style="border-style: none none solid solid; background: #e3e3e3"|Round
|align=center style="border-style: none none solid solid; background: #e3e3e3"|Date
|align=center style="border-style: none none solid solid; background: #e3e3e3"|Location
|align=center style="border-style: none none solid solid; background: #e3e3e3"|Notes
|- align=center
|Win||12-0||align=left|
Steve Martinez
|align=center|
|
|
|align=left| 
|align=left|
|-align=center
|Win|| 11-0 ||align=left| Lanardo Tyner
||| 8 ||   || align=left|  
|align=left|
|-align=center
|Win
|10–0
|align=left| Acacio Joao Ferreira
|
|1 , 1:44
|
|align=left|
|align=left|
|-align=center
|-align=center
|Win
|9–0
|align=left| Josh Williams
|
|1 , 1:14
|
|align=left|
|align=left|
|-align=center
|-align=center
|Win
|8–0
|align=left| Arturo Crespin
|
|1 , 1:14
|
|align=left|
|align=left|
|-align=center
|-align=center
|Win
|7–0
|align=left| Yosamani Abreu
|
|1 , 3:00
|
|align=left|
|align=left|
|-align=center
|-align=center
|Win
|6–0
|align=left| Jeremy Marts
|
|1 , 0:44
|
|align=left|
|align=left|
|-align=center
|-align=center
|Win
|5–0
|align=left| Christian Nava
|
|1 , 0:55
|
|align=left|
|align=left|
|-align=center
|-align=center
|Win
|4–0
|align=left| Angel Hernandez
|
|1 , 0:55
|
|align=left|
|align=left|
|-align=center
|-align=center
|Win
|3–0
|align=left| Jeremy Wood
|
|1 , 0:55
|
|align=left|
|align=left|
|-align=center
|Win
|2–0
|align=left| Cleven Ishe
|
|4
|
|align=left|
|align=left|
|-align=center
|Win
|1–0
|align=left| Steven Chadwick
|TKO
|1 , 1:42
|
|align=left|
|align=left|

Notes

External links

 

Boxers from Ohio
African-American boxers
Sportspeople from Dayton, Ohio
Middleweight boxers
1990 births
Living people
American male boxers
21st-century African-American sportspeople